Kedulan temple is the ruin of a 9th-century Hindu candi located not far from Sambisari temple. The temple is located in Tirtomartani village, Kalasan subdistrict, Sleman Regency, Yogyakarta, Indonesia. The style and architecture bear striking similarities to the nearby Sambisari temple.

The temple complex took form as a compound enclosed in stone walls, with some parts still buried underground. Within the enclosure, there are four temples; one main temple facing east, and three smaller ancillary temples (candi perwara) in front of the main temple on the eastern side in a row running north to south.

History
The main temple was accidentally discovered in 24 November 1993, when a group of volcanic sand miners quarried the land. The land was communally owned by village. Subsequently, archaeological excavations were commenced, led by BP3 Yogyakarta. Currently, the temple is in disrepair; some parts are still buried and some stones are missing. 

As of 2017, the archaeological study and reconstruction project is currently in progress and by early 2018, the temple reconstruction phase entered the anastylosis phase. The restoration of the entire Kedulan Temple complex was expected to be completed by the end of 2018.

See also 

 Kewu Plain
 Kalasan
 Prambanan
 Ratu Boko
 Banyunibo
 Ijo
 Barong

References

External links 

 Kedulan temple map in wikimapia
 Kedulan temple map in google

Kedulan
Mataram Kingdom
Cultural Properties of Indonesia in Yogyakarta